Kanth may refer to:

 Kanth, Moradabad, a municipality in Uttar Pradesh, India
 Kanth (Assembly constituency) in Uttar Pradesh, India
 The German name of Kąty Wrocławskie, a town in Poland
 Kanth (surname)